Peter Artemiev (d. March 30, 1700 Solovetsky Monastery, Russia) - was a Russian Orthodox Deacon, a convert to Byzantine Catholicism, and one of the first martyrs of the Russian Catholic Church.

Biography 
Born as the son of a Russian Orthodox priest, Peter Artemiev spent his childhood in Nizhny Novgorod, Vasilsursk and Suzdal. In years 1687-1688 he studied at the Slavic Greek Latin Academy in Moscow. In February 1688, as a "student and a novice" he travelled with Ioannikos Litkhoudis to the Republic of Venice. In Venice, Artemiev secretly adopted Catholicism. From Venice he travelled to Rome on pilgrimage and to see the Pope, and at the end of 1688 he returned to Moscow. Here Patriarch Adrian ordained him to the rank of deacon. While serving in the Peter and Paul Orthodox Church, Artemev became friendly with Moscow Jesuits Jerzy David and T. Tikhavski. After their expulsion ( 5 October 1689 ), confessed to the Jesuit missionary Fr. Conrad Terpilovsky, in Moscow on his way from Persia.

In 1698, Deacon Peter began to openly profess and preach reunion with the Holy See. According to a denunciation of the priest at St. Peter and Paul Church to Patriarch Adrian, he "harbors many who follow his heresies". Summoned from Suzdal, Peter's father could not persuade him to renounce Catholicism. Peter was sent to the Novospassky Monastery, where the wrote a letter to Patriarch, expressing willingness to accept martyrdom, denouncing the Patriarch and his Greek favorites, and defended the rights of the Old Believers. (The message has not been preserved, but we know the answer to it, entitled "Unmasking the Fallacies of Deacon Peter").

13 June 1698, according to the decision of Council with the participation of Patriarch Adrian, and other senior hierarchs of the Russian Orthodox Church, Artemiev was defrocked, anathematized and banished to a Vazhsky Monastery in Kholmogory diocese. Orders were given to keep him in strict isolation, do not give him ink and paper for writing and to not allow to attend the church. While imprisoned there between July 5 and 11 September 1698, Deacon Peter remained faithful to Catholic beliefs, continued to denounce the anti-Catholic elements of the Orthodox Church and preaching reunion with Rome. As a result, Bishop Athanasius of Kholmogory imprisoned him in Solovetsky Monastery, where Deacon Peter Artemiev died.

References

Further reading
 Панич Т. В. Артемьев Петр // Православная энциклопедия. — М., 2001. — Т. III : «Анфимий — Афанасий». — С. 467-468. — 752 с. — 40 000 экз. — ISBN 5-89572-008-0.
 Панич Т. В. «Ответ» Евфимия Чудовского на «лжущее писание» Петра Артемьева // Общественное сознание и литература XVI—XX вв. Новосиб., 2001. — С. 224—245;
 Юдин А. Артемьев Петр // Католическая энциклопедия. Том I. А-З. — М., 2002. — С. 366.
 Панич Т. В. Евфимий Чудовский и Петр Артемьев: спор двух культур // Сибирский филологический журнал. 2004. — № 3-4. — С. 4-9.
 Панич Т. В. Послание Петра Артемьева отцу в Суздаль // Памятники отечественной книжности: новые тексты, новые интерпретации. сборник научных трудов. — Новосибирск, 2007. — С. 166—187.
 Панич Т. В. Комплекс рукописных материалов, связанных с делами Петра Артемьева и Григория Скибинского (текстологические наблюдения) // Общественное сознание и литература России: источники и исследования. Сборник научных трудов. Сер. «Археография и источниковедение Сибири» Ответственный редактор академик РАН Н. Н. Покровский. — Новосибирск, 2008. — С. 30-53.
 Панич Т. В. Видение Петра Артемьева из послания отцу и его роль в структуре текста // Сибирский филологический журнал. 2018. — № 4. — С. 37-46.
 Петрушко В. И. История Русской Церкви. Первый патриарший период (конец XVI—XVII в.): курс лекций. — М.: Изд-во ПСТГУ, 2020. — С. 429—431. — 460 с. — 1000 экз. — ISBN 978-5-7429-1336-8.
 Панич Т. В. «Тетради» Петра Артемьева: штрихи к биографии писателя // Гуманитарные науки в Сибири. 2021. — Т. 28. — № 3. — С. 11-16.

1700 deaths
Converts to Eastern Catholicism from Eastern Orthodoxy
Eastern Catholics from the Russian Empire
Eastern Catholic writers
Former Russian Orthodox Christians
Russian beatified people
Russian Eastern Catholics
Year of birth unknown
1670 births